The Other Kind of Love is a 1924 American silent drama film directed by Duke Worne and starring William Fairbanks, Dorothy Revier and Edith Yorke.

Cast
 William Fairbanks as Adam Benton 
 Dorothy Revier as Elsie 
 Edith Yorke as Mary Benton 
 Robert Keith as George Benton 
 Rhea Mitchell as The Chorus Girl

References

Bibliography
 Darby, William. Masters of Lens and Light: A Checklist of Major Cinematographers and Their Feature Films. Scarecrow Press, 1991

External links

1924 films
1924 drama films
Silent American drama films
Films directed by Duke Worne
American silent feature films
1920s English-language films
American black-and-white films
1920s American films